The Bulgarian State Railways (abbreviated as БДЖ, BDZ or BDŽ) are Bulgaria's state railway company and the largest railway carrier in the country, established as an entity in 1888. The company's headquarters are located in the capital Sofia. Since the 1990s the BDŽ has met serious competition from automotive transport. Up to 2002 the company also owned/managed the state railway (up to  total of  &  (Septemvri to Dobrinishte only) track gauge railway tracks) infrastructure in the country, when according to EU regulations a new state company, the National Railway Infrastructure Company, was founded and became the owner of the infrastructure.

Bulgaria is a member of the International Union of Railways (UIC). The UIC Country Code for Bulgaria is 52.

History
On 1 January 2002, the new Railway Transport Act entered into force, passed by the National Assembly of the Republic of Bulgaria, according to which the National Company Bulgarian State Railways were split into two separate enterprises – a railway carrier (Bulgarian State Railways EAD) and an infrastructure enterprise (Railway Infrastructure National Company)

The European Commission formally warned Bulgaria in May 2010 for failure to implement the First Railway rules on track access charges.
In October 2010 further restructuring was announced, with BDŽ EAD becoming a holding company, and all rolling stock allocated to passenger & freight subsidiaries.

Company structure

Since the last reforms in 2007, a new organisational structure has been approved.

BDŽ Inc. (a holding company with one shareholder, the Republic of Bulgaria)

 BDŽ Putnicheski Prevozi Ltd. (Bulgarian state railways Passenger transportations) - responsible for the passenger services. The company carried 21.3 million passengers in 2019.
 Bulgarian State Railways Freight Transportations Ltd. - Freight operations and expedition with subsidiary BDZ SPED Ltd. The company carried 13.3 million tonnes of freight in 2009 in 3.1 million tonne-kilometers. Privatisation was attempted in 2012, but called off in 2013 due to financial problems.
 BDŽ Traktzionen Podvizhen Sustav Ltd. - locomotive management and servicing.
 BDŽ-Koncar Inc. - joint venture between BDŽ EAD {Bulgarian State Railways single-member joint-stock company} and KONČAR Group from Croatia with main scope of work locomotive repairs and modernization.

Still there are many problems with the organisational structure of the holding. There is an evident lack of effectiveness in the administration and the main goal of the Ministry of Transport, Information Technologies and Telecommunication is to make the company profitable.

Train
The National rail carrier offers its customers medium and long-distance travel with the following passenger train categories:

fast train with mandatory booking (БВЗР, RБВ);
fast train (БВ);
passenger train (ПВ)
suburban passenger train (КПВ) and
international express (МБВ). 

Fast trains with mandatory booking (БВЗР) are direct descendants of the last commercial category – "express". Fast train timetables with mandatory booking are compiled based on a thorough analysis of the current traffic on major railways. Basically and inviolably rules when developing the schedule of high-speed trains with mandatory reservation is a condition that they stop at a minimum number of stations, which ensure that they move as quickly as possible from point A to point B along the route. For the express traffic of this category of trains, the good technical condition of traction and rolling stock, which has a railway operator, is also important.

In 2017 (from July 1, 2017) for the first time in the history of Bulgarian State Railways and thanks mainly to the renovated with European funds of the 1st and 8th RAILWAY lines, it became possible to release another fast train БВЗР with a maximum speed of 150 km / h. These are the BVZR "Sunny Beach" , which for this purpose serves promoted to Končar Ellok – Zagreb electric locomotives of the 46 200 series and with cars of the 21 – 50 series (second – class coupes), 10 – 50 (first – class coupes) and 84 – 9784-97 (bistro car).

Current traction 
 List of BDŽ locomotives

Gallery

References

Footnotes

External links
 Official website 
 Unofficial map of Bulgarian Railways 
 Boosting Railway infrastructure in Bulgaria 
 Bulgarian Locomotive Forum 
 Bulgarian State Railways classes linst @ Trainspo  
 Live train routes in Bulgaria

Companies based in Sofia
Government-owned companies of Bulgaria
Railway companies of Bulgaria
1885 establishments in Bulgaria
Railway companies established in 1885
Bulgarian brands
Government-owned railway companies